Aiyim Abdildina (born 23 December 1989) is a Kazakhstani freestyle wrestler. She won one of the bronze medals in the women's 55 kg event at the 2010 Asian Games held in Guangzhou, China. She also competed at the Asian Wrestling Championships and between 2009 and 2016 she won a total of one silver medal and five bronze medals at that event.

References

External links 
 

Living people
1989 births
Place of birth missing (living people)
Kazakhstani female sport wrestlers
Asian Games medalists in wrestling
Wrestlers at the 2010 Asian Games
Wrestlers at the 2014 Asian Games
Asian Games bronze medalists for Kazakhstan
Medalists at the 2010 Asian Games
World Wrestling Championships medalists
21st-century Kazakhstani women